Santa Cruz Canton may refer to:
 Santa Cruz (canton), Costa Rica
 Santa Cruz Canton, Ecuador

Canton name disambiguation pages